Arthur Anthony Johnson (born February 6, 1966 in Minneapolis) is a former professional boxer from the United States, nicknamed "Flash".

Amateur career 
1984	Light Flyweight Champion for the Western Olympic Trials
1984	Light Flyweight Junior Nationals Champion

1985	Light Flyweight National Sports Festival Qualifying Champion
1985 	Light Flyweight National Sports Festival Champion, in Baton Rouge, LA
1985	Light Flyweight National Golden Gloves Champion
1985	Flyweight Amateur Boxing Federation Champion

1986	Flyweight Amateur Boxing Federation Champion
1986	Flyweight World Champion Box-off
1986	Inaugural Goodwill Games Gold Medalist (an International Championship)

1987	Flyweight Amateur Boxing Federation Champion
1987	Flyweight Pan-American Box-off Champion

1988	Flyweight Olympic Trials Champion, in Concord, CA
1988	Flyweight Olympic Trials Box-off Champion, in Las Vegas, NV
1988 	Flyweight Olympic Boxing Team (advancing to the Round of 16)

Johnson also held 7 Golden Glove titles in the light flyweight and flyweight division as an open fighter. He competed as a Flyweight for the United States at the 1988 Seoul Olympic Games.

1988 Olympic Results

Round of 64: Defeated Andrea Mannai (Italy) by decision, 5-0
Round of 32: Defeated Bishnu Bahadur Singh (Nepal) referee stopped contest in the second round
Round of 16 Lost to Kwang-Sun Kim (South Korea) by decision, 0-5

Professional career 
Johnson began his career in 1992 and in 1994 challenged Pichit Sitbangprachan for the IBF flyweight title in only his 9th pro fight, but lost a decision.  In 1995 he took on WBO super flyweight title holder Johnny Tapia, but lost a majority decision.  In 1998 he fought Mark Johnson for the IBF flyweight title, but was knocked out in the 1st round, his first and only knockout loss.  In 2000, he lost in his 4th opportunity for a title against IBF bantamweight title holder Tim Austin, by decision. He won the flyweight North American title and National Boxing Association bantamweight and Jr. featherweight world titles as well as the International intercontinental title. He retired in 2003 having won 22 and lost 6 with 14 knockout wins and 1 knockout loss.

References
 
 

1966 births
Boxers at the 1987 Pan American Games
Pan American Games competitors for the United States
Boxers at the 1988 Summer Olympics
Olympic boxers of the United States
Living people
Sportspeople from Minneapolis
Boxers from Minnesota
Super-bantamweight boxers
Winners of the United States Championship for amateur boxers
American male boxers
Competitors at the 1986 Goodwill Games